Vladimir Petrović (born 1 July 1955) is a Serbian football manager and former player.

He is widely known domestically by his nickname Pižon, after the French for pigeon.

Club career
During his playing career, he mostly played for Red Star Belgrade and is one of the five Zvezdine zvezde (The Stars of Red Star) — the legends of the club.

He started out at Red Star making his debut in 1971, at the age of 16. With the team, he won four Yugoslav League Championship titles, one Yugoslav Cup and reached the final of the 1979 UEFA Cup Final, losing to Borussia Mönchengladbach. In 1980, he was named the Yugoslav Footballer of the Year.

In 1982, he moved abroad, and briefly played for Arsenal; he joined the London side in December 1982 and made 22 appearances in the 1982–83 season. At Arsenal he had a brief but memorable career and helped them reach the semi finals of both domestic cups (losing both to Manchester United). He scored twice in the league against Stoke City and West Ham United and once in the FA Cup quarter final against Aston Villa. In June 1983 he left Arsenal and subsequently played for Brest and AS Nancy in France, and Royal Antwerp (1) and Standard Liège (16) in Belgium. In all he played 526 matches for the clubs.

International career
He also represented Yugoslavia 34 times and played in the 1974 World Cup and  1982 World Cup.

Managerial career

As assistant coach, Petrović won the 1990–91 European Cup with Red Star, and as head coach when they won the 1996–97 FR Yugoslavia Cup. He guided the Serbia and Montenegro national under-21 football team to a runners-up finish at the 2004 UEFA European Under-21 Championship.

In 2005, Petrović managed the Chinese Dalian Shide team to the double. On 14 September 2007 Petrović was named as coach of the Chinese national team. After China failed to qualify for the 2010 World Cup, he was sacked.

On 2 June 2009 Petrović returned to Red Star Belgrade. As manager, Petrović was part of takeover of Red Star by the club's veterans, replacing caretaker/interim coach Siniša Gogić. On 21 March 2010, Red Star officials unexpectedly sacked Petrović after a league defeat against Metalac.

On 4 June 2010 he was named the manager of Romanian club Politehnica Timișoara.

On 15 September 2010 Petrović was named the new head coach of Serbia. On 14 October 2011 the football association of Serbia announced they had terminated their contract with Petrović.

In 2013, he was the head coach of the Iraq national team. On 13 December 2013, he was named the head of coach of the Yemen national team. In May 2014, he resigned following the expiration of the contract. In 2015, Petrović managed OFK Beograd.

Career statistics

Managerial statistics

Honours

Player

Club
Red Star Belgrade
Yugoslav First League: 1972–73, 1976–77, 1979–80, 1980–81
Yugoslav Cup: 1981–82
UEFA Cup runner-up: 1978–79

Manager
Red Star Belgrade
FR Yugoslavia Cup: 1996–97

Dalian Shide
Chinese Super League: 2005
Chinese FA Cup: 2005

International
Serbia and Montenegro U21
UEFA Euro U21 runner-up: 2004

References

External links

 
 

1955 births
Living people
Footballers from Belgrade
Serbian footballers
Yugoslav footballers
Serbian football managers
Serbian expatriate football managers
Yugoslav First League players
English Football League players
Belgian Pro League players
Ligue 1 players
Ligue 2 players
Red Star Belgrade footballers
Arsenal F.C. players
Stade Brestois 29 players
AS Nancy Lorraine players
Standard Liège players
Royal Antwerp F.C. players
1974 FIFA World Cup players
1982 FIFA World Cup players
Yugoslavia international footballers
Red Star Belgrade non-playing staff
Red Star Belgrade managers
Atromitos F.C. managers
China national football team managers
FK Vojvodina managers
FK Bor managers
FC Politehnica Timișoara managers
Yugoslav expatriate footballers
Serbian expatriate footballers
Expatriate footballers in Belgium
Expatriate footballers in England
Expatriate footballers in France
Expatriate football managers in China
Expatriate football managers in Romania
Serbia national football team managers
Yemen national football team managers
OFK Beograd managers
Association football midfielders
Chinese Super League managers
Serbian people of Croatian descent
Yugoslav expatriate sportspeople in Belgium
Yugoslav expatriate sportspeople in England
Yugoslav expatriate sportspeople in France
Serbian expatriate sportspeople in Yemen
Serbian expatriate sportspeople in China
Serbian expatriate sportspeople in Iraq
Serbian expatriate sportspeople in Greece
Expatriate football managers in Yemen
Expatriate football managers in Iraq
Expatriate football managers in Greece
Serbian expatriate sportspeople in Romania
Expatriate football managers in Belarus
Serbian expatriate sportspeople in Belarus